Blue Steel is a 1934 opera by American composer William Grant Still. Overall, the music assumes a jazz form, harmonically and rhythmically, although at other times, the music merges into the form of a Negro spiritual.

Overview
A description of the opera is as follows:

See also
 List of jazz-influenced classical compositions

References

Further reading

External links
  (selection; 2:53)

Compositions by William Grant Still
1934 compositions